Jul i Betlehem (Swedish: "Christmas in Bethlehem") is a Christmas album, released on 10 November 1999, from Swedish pop singer Carola Häggkvist. "Jul i Betlehem" was recorded in Bethlehem on 15 June - 27 September 1999, so it could be released for Christmas that year. On the album charts, the album peaked at number 1 in Sweden and number 6 in Norway.

Track listing
O helga natt (Cantique de noël) - 4:20
O Betlehem, du lilla stad (O Little Town of Bethlehem) - 4:05
Himlen i min famn - 4.50
The Little Drummer Boy (feat. Blues) - 4.30
Nu tändas tusen juleljus - 3:00
En stjärna lyser så klar (En stjerne skinner i natt) - 3:50
Härlig är Jorden (Schönster Herr Jesu) - 4:02
I Wonder as I Wander - 3:20
Gläns över sjö och strand - 4:20
Mitt hjerte alltid vanker - 4:00
Mary's Boy Child - 3:40
Jag är så glad var julenatt - 4:20
Stilla natt (Stille Nacht, heilige Nacht) - 5:15
Dagen är kommen (Adeste Fideles) - 4:20

Charts

References

1999 Christmas albums
Carola Häggkvist albums
Christmas albums by Swedish artists
Gospel Christmas albums